The 1869 Marsden by-election was a by-election held on 25 January 1869 during the 4th New Zealand Parliament in the Northland electorate of .

The by-election was caused by the resignation of the incumbent MP Francis Hull on 14 December 1878.

The by-election was won by John Munro. As there were no other candidates, he was declared elected unopposed on 25 January; the papers published several reports of his speeches.

References

Marsden 1869
1869 elections in New Zealand
Politics of the Northland Region
January 1869 events